Mahaan Kanakku  is a 2011 Indian Tamil-language drama film directed by Sampath Arumugam, an assistant to Sasi. The film stars Ramana and newcomer Reecha Sinha. The music was composed by A. K. Rishal Sai with cinematography by Karthik and editing by Suresh Urs. The film released on 30 December 2011.

Cast

 Ramana as Jeeva
 Reecha Sinha as Anjali
 Srinath as Professor Varadharajan 
 Devadarshini as Janaki
 Saravana Subbiah as Auditor 
 Sathish as Mandotharan, Jeeva's friend
 TSK as Jeeva's friend
 Lollu Sabha Jeeva as Gopi
 Manobala  as Traffic Police Officer
 S. N. Lakshmi as Orphanage Caretaker
 A. Venkatesh as Math Teacher
 Suresh Urs as CEO Suresh
 Sabitha Anand
 Charmila
 Neethiyin Kural C. R. Bhaskaran as Jeeva's lawyer
 Karthik as Opposition Lawyer 
 Neelu
 Muthukaalai

Production 
The film began production under the title Gandhi Kanakku. The name was later changed to Mahaan Kanakku after a case was filed against the name.

Awards

Release
Behindwoods gave this film two out of five stars stating that "While movies like Ethan briefly touched upon the banking problem, Mahaan Kanakku goes for the throat and gets it".

References

2011 films
2010s Tamil-language films